Bucknell Ridge is a mountainous ridge just above the Cranfield Icefalls, extending east–west along the southern side of Darwin Glacier near its mouth. It was mapped by the Darwin Glacier Party of the Commonwealth Trans-Antarctic Expedition (1956–58) and named for E.S. Bucknell, a member of the party.

References
 

Ridges of Oates Land